Epacris curtisiae is a species of flowering plant in the heath family Ericaceae and is endemic to north-western Tasmania. It is a shrub with egg-shaped to almost circular leaves and tube-shaped white flowers crowded in upper leaf axils.

Description
The five stamens and the style are enclosed within the petal tube.

Taxonomy and naming
Epacris curtisiae was first formally described in 1988 by S. Jean Jarman in the Papers and Proceedings of the Royal Society of Tasmania from specimens collected near the Nelson Bay River in 1985. The specific epithet (curtisiae) honours Winifred Curtis.

Distribution and habitat

References

curtisiae
Ericales of Australia
Flora of Tasmania
Plants described in 1988
Endemic flora of Australia